Agnieszka Radwańska was the defending champion, but lost in the semifinals to Caroline Wozniacki.

Wozniacki went on to win the title, defeating Naomi Osaka in the final, 7–5, 6–3.

Seeds
The top four seeds received a bye into the second round.

Draw

Finals

Top half

Bottom half

Qualifying

Seeds

Qualifiers

Draw

First qualifier

Second qualifier

Third qualifier

Fourth qualifier

References
Main Draw
Qualifying Draw

Singles